Amateis is a surname. Notable people with the surname include: 

Edmond Amateis (1897–1981), American sculptor, son of Louis
Louis Amateis (1855–1913), American sculptor